Kadalora Kavithaigal is a 1986 Indian Tamil-language romantic drama film directed by Bharathiraja. The film stars Sathyaraj and Rekha, with Raja, Janagaraj and Kamala Kamesh in supporting roles. It is about transformation of a ruffian, who has a prison record and his understanding of love through an elementary education. In that process, he falls in love with the school teacher.

Kadalora Kavithaigal was the debut film for Rekha and Raja. It was primarily shot in Muttom, Kanyakumari. The film was released on 5 July 1986, and was remade in Telugu as Aradhana, and in Kannada as Kaurava.

Plot 
In Muttom, Kanyakumari, Chinnappa Das is a ruffian who has a prison record and returns to his village after serving his prison term. He is persuaded by his maternal uncle's daughter Gangamma to marry him. In one of his encounters at an elementary school, he meets a lady school teacher Jennifer who gives a sound scolding on how ignorant fools behave.

There is an element of purity in Das's heart which the school teacher could identify, this transforms his life forever. Set in a coastal milieu, the duo often meet on the beach, amidst sunlit sea and splashing waves on the rocks. In a sequence, Das makes  the teacher stand alone atop a seaside hillock, Das from down below on the sands announces aloud to her that "you are my God".,it is eventual that teacher developed a feelings for das on the other side teacher's family want her to marry an acquaintance of her family which would lead to a drama of emotions

Cast 
 Sathyaraj as Chinnappa Das
 Rekha as Jennifer
 Raja as Lawrence
 Anuradha Vasudev as Josephine
 Ranjini as Gangamma
 Janagaraj
 Kamala Kamesh as Thayamma
 Lalitha Sharma

Production 
Kadalora Kavithaigal is the debut for Raja and Rekha as actors. The film had Sathyaraj deviating from the negative roles he was previously known for. It was primarily shot in Muttom, Kanyakumari.

Soundtrack 
The music was composed by Ilaiyaraaja. The song "Adi Aathadi" is set in the Carnatic raga known as Shivaranjani, and "Kodiyile Malliyapoo" is set in Natabhairavi. "Adi Aathadi" was partially adapted as "Aa Jaana Tere Bin", composed by Anand–Milind for Bol Radha Bol (1992).

Release and reception 
Kadalora Kavithaigal was released on 5 July 1986. Jayamanmadhan of Kalki said that while the sea in the film's title was breathtaking, the poem in the title was incomplete.

References

Bibliography

External links 

1980s Tamil-language films
1986 films
Films directed by Bharathiraja
Films scored by Ilaiyaraaja
Indian romantic drama films
Tamil films remade in other languages